Viktor Robertovich Tsoi (21 June 1962 – 15 August 1990) was a Soviet singer and songwriter who co-founded Kino, one of the most popular and musically influential bands in the history of Russian music.

Born and raised in Leningrad (now known as Saint Petersburg), Tsoi started writing songs as a teenager. Throughout his career, Tsoi contributed a plethora of musical and artistic works, including ten albums. After Kino appeared and performed in the 1987 Soviet film Assa, the band's popularity surged, triggering a period referred to as "Kinomania", and leading to Tsoi's leading role in the 1988 Kazakh new wave art film The Needle. In 1990, after their high-profile concert at the Luzhniki Stadium, Tsoi briefly relocated to Latvia with bandmate Yuri Kasparyan to work on the band's next album. Two months after the concert, Tsoi died in a car collision.

He is regarded as one of the most important pioneers of rock music in Russia and is credited with popularizing the genre throughout the Soviet Union. He retains a devoted following throughout the former Soviet Union, where he is known as one of the most influential and popular people in the history of Russian music.

Viktor Tsoi became popular by combining his music and lyrics with philosophy.

Early life
Viktor Robertovich Tsoi was born on 21 June 1962, in a maternity hospital on Kuznetsovskaya Street in Leningrad. He was the only child of Valentina Vasilyevna Tsoi, a Russian schoolteacher, and Robert Maximovich Tsoi, a Soviet Korean engineer from Kzyl-Orda, Kazakhstan, where his Korean parents had been exiled after Stalin's 1937 deportation of Koreans in the Soviet Union. The family's Korean ancestry can be traced back to Songjin, Hamgyong, Korea (present-day Kimchaek, North Korea), where Viktor's great-grandfather Choi Yong-nam was born in 1893.

Tsoi grew up in the vicinity of the Moskovsky Victory Park. The family lived in the notable "general's house" at the corner of Moskovsky Avenue and Basseynaya Street (the building is now an architectural monument). For some time Tsoi studied at a nearby school in Frunze Street, where his mother worked.

From 1974 until 1977, Tsoi attended a secondary art school, where he was a member of the band Palata No. 6 (English: "Ward No. 6"). From 1977, he attended the Serov Art School, until he was expelled in 1979 for poor performance. Afterwards, he attended SGPTU-61, a secondary city vocational school, where he studied to become a wood carver. In his youth, he was a fan of Mikhail Boyarsky and Vladimir Vysotsky, and later Bruce Lee, after whom he started modelling his image. He was fond of martial arts and often sparred "in Chinese" with bandmate Yuri Kasparyan.

Career
Tsoi began writing songs at the age of 17. In the 1970s and the 1980s, rock music was an underground movement limited mostly to Leningrad; Moscow pop stars, endorsed by the Soviet state, ruled the charts and received the most exposure from the media. However, rock music was not popular with the government, and rock bands received little to no funding and were given little exposure by the media. The Leningrad Rock Club was one of the few public places where rock bands were allowed to perform.

In the late 1970s and early 1980s, Tsoi was a close friend of Alexei Rybin. Rybin, a member of the hard rock band Piligrimy, and Tsoi, who played bass guitar in the group Palata # 6, met at the house of Andrei "Svin" Panov, in whose apartment people and musicians often gathered, and also where his own punk band Avtomaticheskie udovletvoriteli rehearsed. By this time, Tsoi had begun to perform the songs he wrote at parties.

Tsoi and Rybin, as members of Автоматические удовлетворители (Avtomaticheskie udovletvoriteli), went to Moscow and performed punk-rock metal at Artemy Troitsky's underground concerts. During a similar performance in Leningrad on the occasion of Andrei Tropillo's anniversary, Tsoi and Rybin first met Boris Grebenshchikov. Later, after a solo concert by Grebenshchikov, they met up and Tsoi played two of his songs to him. Grebenshchikov, who had already been a relatively established musician in the Leningrad underground scene, was very impressed by Tsoi's talent and helped him start up his own band.

Beginnings of Kino
At the Leningrad Rock Club, Tsoi played as a solo artist supported by members of the band Aquarium. Tsoi's lyrics and music impressed the crowd. In the summer of 1981, Tsoi, Rybin, and Oleg Valinsky formed the band Garin i giperboloydy. The name was a homage to the classic Russian novel The Hyperboloid of Engineer Garin by Aleksey Tolstoy. In autumn of the same year, the band was admitted to membership of the Leningrad Rock Club. Not long after, Valinsky was conscripted into the army, leaving only Tsoi and Rybin, who renamed the band to Kino. Kino began recording its debut album in the spring of 1982.

First albums
Kino began recording its debut album, 45, in the spring of 1982 at Andrei Tropillo's studio. Members of Aquarium also took part in the recording, with Boris Grebenshchikov directing the album. By the summer, the album was completely finished. Its duration was 45 minutes, after which the album was named 45. The album got some distribution and Kino performed in many apartment concerts in Moscow and Leningrad.

On 19 February 1983, a joint concert with Kino and Aquarium took place. After the concert, Yuri Kasparyan was invited to join the band as a guitarist. In the spring, Rybin left Kino due to disagreements with Tsoi. Tsoi and Kasparyan spent the summer on joint rehearsals. As a result, Kino recorded the album 46, which was initially thought of as a demo for Nachalnik Kamchatki. 46 was widely distributed and was considered to be a full-fledged album. In the fall of 1983, Tsoi went to a psychiatric hospital in Pryazhka, where he spent a month and a half. As a result, Tsoi was not conscripted into the army. After being discharged from the psychiatric hospital, he wrote the song "Trankvilizator".

"Peremen!/"My zhdyom peremen" ("Changes!"/"We are waiting for changes"), first performed by Tsoi in the summer of 1986, quickly became an important political song, an embodiment of the spirit of the Perestroika. It remains a powerful political song, prominently used during 2020–2021 Belarusian protests.

Rise to fame
1987 was a breakthrough year for Kino. The release of their 6th album Gruppa Krovi triggered what was then called "Kinomania". The open political climate under glasnost allowed Tsoi to make Gruppa Krovi, his most political album, yet it also allowed him to record a sound of music that no one before him had been able to play. Most of the tracks on the album were directed at the youth of the Soviet Union, telling them to take control and make changes within the nation; some of the songs addressed the social problems crippling the nation. The sound and lyrics of the album made Tsoi a hero among Soviet youth and Kino the most popular rock band ever. In the diverse Soviet republics, fans translated his originally Russian lyrics into their native languages as well.

Over the next few years, Tsoi appeared in several successful movies and also travelled to the United States to promote his films at film festivals. Several more albums were released, their themes were once again mostly political, further fueling the band's popularity. Even though Tsoi was a huge star, he still lived a relatively ordinary life. He kept his old job in the boiler room of an apartment building, called Kamchatka, which is currently a museum/club dedicated to the singer. The fact that he worked at a boiler plant surprised many people. Tsoi said that he enjoyed the work and he also needed the money to support the band, as they still received no government support and their albums were copied and passed around the nation via magnitizdat free of charge. This made Tsoi even more popular among the people because it showed that he was down to earth and they could relate to him. He also went on tour in 1988–1989 to Italy, France, and Denmark. Kino's finest hour came in 1990 with a concert at Moscow's Luzhniki Stadium; 62,000 fans filled the stands to celebrate the triumph of the USSR's most successful rock group. It also was one of the four times the Luzhniki Olympic Fire was ever lit.

Film appearances
In 1987, the band Kino, along with other Russian rock bands, appeared as themselves in Assa, a film by Sergei Solovyov. However, the film as a whole has nothing to do with rock music, and Kino simply appears as a cameo in the end.

In 1988, Viktor Tsoi starred as the protagonist in The Needle, directed by Rashid Nugmanov and written by Aleksandr Baranov and Bakhyt Kilibayev. The plot is centered around the character Moro, who returns to Almaty, Kazakhstan, to collect money owed to him. While waiting out an unexpected delay, he visits his former girlfriend Dina and discovers she has become a morphine addict. He decides to help her quit and fight the local drug mafia responsible for her condition. But Moro finds a deadly opponent in "the doctor," the mafia kingpin who is exploiting Dina. Tsoi was nominated for an award for his role in the film.

The film's soundtrack, including original music by Tsoi's band Kino, contributes to the overall feeling of the movie, in addition to the film's use of post-modern twists and surreal scenes.

The movie was officially released in February 1989 in the Soviet Union.

Death

On 15 August 1990, in Latvia, Tsoi was driving on the Sloka – Talsi highway, near Tukums and Riga. At 12:28 p.m., Tsoi died in a car collision. The investigation concluded that Tsoi had fallen asleep while driving, possibly due to fatigue; he had not consumed alcohol for at least 48 hours before his death. At the time he fell asleep Tsoi was driving at a speed of at least 130 km/h, causing his dark blue Moskvitch-2141 to turn into the oncoming lane and collide with an Ikarus 250 bus. Tsoi was pronounced dead at the scene. The bus driver was not injured. Tsoi's car was completely destroyed to the point that one of its tires was never found.

The death of Viktor Tsoi was a shock to many fans, some even having committed suicide. On 17 August, Komsomolskaya Pravda, one of the main Soviet newspapers, had the following to say about Tsoi and his meaning to the youth of the nation:

On 19 August, he was buried in a closed casket at the Bogoslovskoe Cemetery in Leningrad. Thousands of people came to the funeral.

Kasparyan left for Leningrad prior to the collision, with a tape containing the only recording of Tsoi's vocals for the band's next album. The remaining members of Kino finished and released the Black Album in December. It later became the band's most popular creation.

Personal life
Viktor lived with his wife, Marianna Tsoi, and his son Alexander (born 1985). Tsoi lived a poor life, with Marianna saying that they could not even afford a proper wedding dress. The apartment building boiler room he worked at was nicknamed "Kamchatka", and is now the site of a museum and rock club dedicated to Tsoi. He previously also worked in Kyiv, Ukraine, however after the authorities found out he was working illegally, he was sent to Moscow.

During the filming of Assa, Tsoi met Natalia Razlogova, the director's assistant. Tsoi later fell in love with Razlogova and separated from Marianna. However, they did not divorce, for the sake of their son.

Legacy

Portraits of Viktor Tsoi are displayed today in many places around Russia, from graffiti on the fences of Saint Petersburg to an entire wall dedicated to Viktor Tsoi in a bylane of the famous Arbat Street in Moscow, where fans still gather to remember their hero. Other Tsoi Walls can also be found in Minsk, Belarus and in some regions of Kazakhstan. In 2000 some of the nation's top rock bands came together and released their interpretations of Kino's best songs as a tribute to Viktor Tsoi on what would have been his 38th birthday.

In 2012, on what would have been Tsoi's 50th birthday, the remaining members of Kino gathered to record the song "Ataman", with his vocals that were recovered from his car crash but never used because of its poor quality. The drummer Georgiy Guryanov died shortly after, making "Ataman" the last song recorded by Kino and its members.

On 15 August 2020, the 30th anniversary of Tsoi's death was marked. In memory of Tsoi, the Palace Bridge in St. Petersburg was lifted to his songs. Fans across the country commemorated his death, especially in his home city of St. Petersburg where a number of events and concerts were organised, as well as at the Tsoi Wall in Moscow. The day before, a 4-meter-tall monument dedicated to Tsoi was erected in St. Petersburg in his memory.

The South Korean rock band YB covered the song "Gruppa krovi" on their 1999 album Korean Rock Remade.

Viktor An, a South Korean-born Russian short track speed skater, chose his Russian name "Viktor" in honour of Tsoi.

Popular culture 
 Joanna Stingray commemorated him in her song, "Tsoi Song".
 On 21 June 2012, Google commemorated Tsoi's 50th birthday with a Google Doodle reminiscent of the Tsoi Wall.
 In 2015, Tsoi's song "Kukushka" was covered by Russian singer Polina Gagarina for the movie Battle for Sevastopol.
 In the 2018 film Leto, Tsoi was played by Teo Yoo.
 In 2018, a monument to Tsoi was erected in Almaty, Kazakhstan.
 In the 2019 videogame, Metro Exodus, multiple songs by Kino such as “We Want Changes”, “Watch Yourself”, “A Song Without Words” and “Shut The Door Behind Me", can be heard on the radio during segments set on a train as it travels across Russia, its crew in search of a hospitable place to live after a nuclear war. “Shut The Door Behind Me” can also be heard in the beginning of the level 'Taiga' as the player and a crew member scout out a valley.
 In the 2020 videogame, Cyberpunk 2077, graffiti reading "цой жив" (Tsoi lives) can be found in various locations.

Family

 Maxim Maximovich Tsoi (Korean name: Choi Seung Jun, Hangul: 최승준) — Viktor's grandfather on his father's side; a Korean from Kazakhstan.
 Robert Maximovich Tsoi (born 5 May 1938, Korean name: Choi Dong Yeol, Hangul: 최동열) — Viktor's father; an engineer.
 Valentina Vasiliyevna Tsoi (née Guseva) (8 January 1937 – 28 November 2009) — Viktor's mother; a physical education teacher.
 Marianna Igorevna Tsoi (born Kovalyova, Rodovanskaya after her first marriage) (5 March 1959 – 27 June 2005) — Viktor's wife; Viktor and Marianna met in 1982, married in 1984, and separated in 1987, after which Viktor moved in with his new girlfriend Natalia Razlogova. Marianna became the owner of the rights to Viktor's songs after his death. She survived him by 15 years, dying of cancer in 2005.
 Alexander Viktorovich Tsoi (performed as Molchanov) (born 5 August, 1985) — Viktor's son; a graphic designer and musician. In June 2012, on his first ever interview, he said that he owns a club in St. Petersburg, writes and performs music, and works as a graphic designer, creating album covers for other musicians. He was a guitarist in the band Para bellvm.
 Natalia Emilyevna Razlogova (born 20 October 1956) — Viktor's girlfriend; a film critic, translator, and sister of the famous film critic Kirill Razlogov. After Tsoi's death, she married journalist Yevgeny Dodolev and left for the US, where she and Dodolev had two children.

References

Cited sources

Further reading
  "Виктор Цой, Звезда по Имени Солнце: Стихи, Песни, Воспоминания", Eksmo, 2001.

External links
 

 
 Viktor Tsoi's 50th Birthday Google Doodle

1962 births
1990 deaths
Koryo-saram
Musicians from Saint Petersburg
Singers from Saint Petersburg
Russian singer-songwriters
Soviet male film actors
Russian male film actors
Road incident deaths in Latvia
Road incident deaths in the Soviet Union
Russian people of Korean descent
Russian rock singers
Russian punk rock musicians
Kino
Soviet male singers
20th-century Russian male singers
20th-century Russian singers
New wave musicians
Russian male singer-songwriters
Post-punk musicians
Soviet people of Korean descent
Burials at Bogoslovskoe Cemetery